Chah Deraz or Chah-e Deraz or Chahderaz may refer to:
 Chah Deraz, Fars
 Chah Deraz, Bandar Lengeh, Hormozgan Province
 Chah Deraz, Minab, Hormozgan Province
 Chah Deraz, Kerman
 Chah Deraz, Lorestan
 Chah-e Deraz, Sistan and Baluchestan
 Chah Deraz, South Khorasan